Humble is an unincorporated community located in Russell County, Kentucky, United States.

A post office was established in the community in 1906 and named the Humble family.

References

Unincorporated communities in Russell County, Kentucky
Unincorporated communities in Kentucky